Songs Are Such Good Things is the fifth album by Scottish singer Lena Zavaroni, released in 1978 by Galaxy Records.

Track listing 
 Speedy Gonzales (you'd better come home)
 Another Somebody Done Somebody Wrong Song
 I Always Seem To Wind Up Loving You
 Keep Your Mind On Love
 Songs Are Such Good Things
 I Should Have Listened To Mama
 The Air That I Breathe
 Crazy Little Lover Boy
 Drowning in Magic
 My Boyfriend's Back
 Love Is Falling in Love Again
 I Wanna Boogie Wid Ya

Personnel 
 Lena Zavaroni – vocals

References

1978 albums
Lena Zavaroni albums